, nicknamed Ta-bo,   is a Japanese former professional basketball player who played for Tokyo Cinq Reves of the bj League in Japan.  He also played for Japan men's national 3x3 team.

Career statistics

Regular season 

|-
| align="left" | 2015-16
| align="left" | Hiroshima L
|10 ||0 || 12.0 ||.214  || .150 ||.750  || 0.8 ||1.2 || 0.8 ||0.0  || 3.3
|-
| align="left" | 2015-16
| align="left" | Tokyo CR
|24 ||1 || 14.5 ||.324  || .185 ||1.000  || 1.1 ||1.5  || 0.8 ||0.0  || 2.3
|-
|-
|- class="sortbottom"
! style="text-align:center;" colspan=2| Career 
! 34 ||1  || 13.8 || .276 || .170 || .833 || 1.0 || 1.4 || 0.8 ||0.0 || 2.6
|-

References

1989 births
Living people
Hiroshima Lightning players
Japanese men's basketball players
Japan national 3x3 basketball team players
Tokyo Cinq Rêves players
Sportspeople from Miyazaki Prefecture
Guards (basketball)